Radomno is a Dobiesławiec village's settlement located in Poland, in Gmina Będzino.

References

Villages in Koszalin County